John Guest may refer to:

People

John Guest (judge) (died 1707), Chief Justice of the Supreme Court of Pennsylvania
John Guest (1722–1785), British businessman and patriarch of the Guest family
John Josiah Guest (1785–1852), British industrialist
John Guest (naval officer) (1822–1879), United States Navy officer
John Guest (politician) (1867–1931), British Labour Party Member of Parliament
Jack Guest (1906–1972), Canadian rowing Olympic medal winner
John Rodney Guest (born 1935), British microbiologist
John Guest (geologist) (1938–2012), British volcanologist and planetary scientist

Other

John Guest (company), British manufacturer of push-in fittings, pipe and plastic plumbing systems